This list is of Goryeo Buddhist paintings, Korea (918-1392). Approximately one hundred and sixty hanging scrolls are known.

References

Goryeo
Korean painting
Buddhism in Korea
Buddhist art
Lists of paintings
Korea-related lists
Buddhism-related lists